Dadeh Saqi (also Romanized as Dadeh Sāqī; also known as Deh-e Sāqī) is a village in Bash Qaleh Rural District, in the Central District of Urmia County, West Azerbaijan Province, Iran. At the 2006 census, its population was 346, in 88 families.

References 

Populated places in Urmia County